Asmaa Ali al-Zarouni (also transliterated as Asma' al-Zar'uni and Asma al-Zarooni, born 1961) is the Librarian of Amani Library, Emirati librarian, poet, short story author, and educator.

Biography
Al-Zarouni is a native of Sharjah, and has a bachelor's degree in education. By profession, she is a librarian. She has served as Deputy Chairperson of the Emirates Writers Association. She has appeared on numerous panels regarding education in her native country.

Some of al-Zarouni's work has been anthologized in English.

Conferences and seminars headed or attended by Asmaa include:
 Emirates Post International Letter Writing Competition (2003)
International LetterWriting Competition (2006): conducted by Ministry of Education and the Emirates Writers Union.
2018 Livre Paris (Paris Book Fair 2018)

References

1961 births
Living people
21st-century Emirati poets
Emirati short story writers
Emirati educators
20th-century poets
20th-century short story writers
21st-century poets
21st-century short story writers
Women educators
People from the Emirate of Sharjah
21st-century Emirati writers
21st-century Emirati women writers
20th-century Emirati writers
20th-century Emirati women writers
20th-century Emirati poets
Emirati women poets